Litoria balatus, the slender bleating tree frog, is a frog in the family Hylidae endemic to Australia, in Queensland and the Bunya Mountains.

References

Frogs of Australia
Amphibians described in 2021
balatus